Gay and Lesbian is a common term for Homosexuality and LGBT

Gay and Lesbian or Gay & Lesbian may refer to:

Starting with the term
Gay and Lesbian Acceptance
Gay and Lesbian Activists Alliance
Gay & Lesbian Advocates & Defenders
Gay & Lesbian Alliance Against Defamation
Gay and Lesbian Association of Choruses
Gay and Lesbian Athletics Foundation
Gay and Lesbian Equality Network
Gay & Lesbian Fund for Colorado
Gay and Lesbian Humanist Association
Gay and Lesbian International Sport Association
Gay and Lesbian Kingdom of the Coral Sea Islands
Gay and Lesbian Medical Association
Gay and Lesbian Tennis Alliance
Gay & Lesbian Review Worldwide
Gay and Lesbian Times
Gay & Lesbian Victory Fund

including the term
Association of Gay and Lesbian Psychiatrists
Affirmation: Gay & Lesbian Mormons
Chicago Gay and Lesbian Hall of Fame
Dublin Gay and Lesbian Film Festival
Harvard Gay & Lesbian Caucus
Houston Gay and Lesbian Film Festival
International Gay and Lesbian Human Rights Commission
International Gay and Lesbian Football Association
International Gay and Lesbian Travel Association
Journal of the Gay and Lesbian Medical Association
Journal of Gay & Lesbian Mental Health
Leslie Lohman Museum of Gay and Lesbian Art
Lisbon Gay & Lesbian Film Festival
Los Angeles Gay and Lesbian Center
National Gay & Lesbian Chamber of Commerce
National Gay and Lesbian Task Force
North Carolina Gay & Lesbian Film Festival
Out In Africa South African Gay and Lesbian Film Festival
Southwest Gay and Lesbian Film Festival
Tampa International Gay and Lesbian Film Festival

See also
Gay (disambiguation)
Lesbian (disambiguation)
Lesbian and Gay (disambiguation)